Jameson Bostic (born 29 January 1984) is an American professional boxer who now resides in Auckland, New Zealand. Bostic is a former OPBF light heavyweight champion and was ranked in the WBC after defeating WBC 13th-ranked Japanese boxer Yuzo Kiyota.

In 2007, Bostic took on Don King as his manager, but the two split apart due to contractual issues and keeping Bostic inactive for over 13 months in 2008. After splitting from King, Bostic was brought over to New Zealand by Craig Thomson to restart his career. Bostic moved over to New Zealand in 2009.

Professional boxing titles
World Boxing Council
OPBF light heavyweight title (175 lbs)

Professional boxing record

References

1984 births
Living people
Boxers from Auckland
New Zealand male boxers
Light-heavyweight boxers
Boxers from New York (state)